Amauris inferna is a butterfly in the family Nymphalidae. It is found in Cameroon, Gabon, Equatorial Guinea, the Democratic Republic of the Congo, Uganda and Tanzania. The habitat consists of forests.

Adult males mud-puddle.

Subspecies
Amauris inferna inferna (Cameroon, Gabon, Democratic Republic of the Congo: Kinshasa)
Amauris inferna discus Talbot, 1940 (Democratic Republic of the Congo: west and central to Kwilu, Sankuru, Kisangami)
Amauris inferna grogani Sharpe, 1901 (western Uganda, Democratic Republic of the Congo: east to northern Kivu and Ituri)
Amauris inferna moka Talbot, 1940 (Bioko)
Amauris inferna uganda Talbot, 1940 (Uganda, Tanzania: north-west and Kere Hill)

References

Seitz, A. Die Gross-Schmetterlinge der Erde 13: Die Afrikanischen Tagfalter. Plate XIII 25 as hecatoides

Butterflies described in 1871
Amauris
Butterflies of Africa
Taxa named by Arthur Gardiner Butler